Nina is a feminine given name with various origins. It is a predominantly east European and Slavic name that has later been used globally.

There are alternate spellings depending on the name's origin. Nína is an Icelandic name used in Iceland. Niná is a Sami name used in Northern Norway, northern Sweden, northern Finland and the Murmansk Oblast.

Nina may also serve as a short form of names ending in "-nina/-ina", including Marina, Katharina, Antonina, Giannina, and Constantina. Nina can also serve as a short form of Anna.

It also has a relation to the Spanish word "niña", which translates as "little girl" and has meaning in several other languages: (Hebrew: "God was gracious, God has shown favor"); (Persian: "nice"); (Hindi: "beautiful"); (Swahili: "mother"); (Native American: "strong"); (Hebrew: "pearl"); (Chamorro: "glimmer of light");(spanish: "angel") (Arabic: "favor, one who is gracious"); (Greek: "flower").

Given name

Nina Chanel Abney (born 1982), American artist
Nina Afanasyeva (born 1939), Russian-Sami politician and language activist
Nina Agapova (1926–2021), Russian actress
Nina Agdal (born 1992), Danish model
Nina Alisova (1915–1996), Russian actress
Nina Allan (born 1966), British writer
Nina E. Allender (1873–1957), American cartoonist and activist
Nina Alovert (born 1935), Russian photographer
Nina Amir (born 1999), Israeli sports sailor
Nina Ananiashvili (born 1963), Georgian ballerina
Nina Nymark Andersen (born 1972), Norwegian footballer
Nina Andreyeva (1938–2020), Soviet Communist Party official
Nina Anisimova (dancer) (1909–1979), Russian dancer and choreographer
Nina Anisimova (triathlete) (born 1973), Russian athlete
Nina Ansaroff (born 1985), American mixed martial artist 
Nina Antonia (born 1960), British author
Nina Arianda (born 1984), American actress
Nina Arsenault (born 1974), Canadian performance artist and freelance writer
Nina Arvesen (born 1961), American actress
Nina Åström (born 1962), Finnish singer
Nina Auerbach (1943–2017), American professor
Nina Averina (born 1935), Russian journalist, local historian and poet
Nina Axelrod (born 1955), American actress
Nina Baden-Semper (born 1945), British actress
Nina Badrić (born 1972), Croatian singer
Nina Bang (1866–1928), Danish politician
Nina Bari (1901–1961), Russian mathematician
Nina Barr Wheeler (1909–1978), American artist
Nina Bates (born 1985), Bosnian figure skater
Nina Bawden (1925–2012), British author
Nina Bendigkeit, German singer
Nina Berberova (1901–1993), Russian author
Nina Berman (born 1960), American photographer
Nina Betschart (born 1995), Swiss volleyball player
Nina Bjedov (born 1971), Serbian basketball player
Nina Björk (born 1967), Swedish author
Nina Blackwood (born 1955), American disc jockey
Nina Bocharova (1924–2020), Ukrainian gymnast
Nina Bohm (born 1958), Swedish tennis player
Nina Yang Bongiovi, American film producer
Nina Bonner (born 1972), Australian field hockey player
Nina Bott (born 1978), German actress
Nina Bracewell-Smith (born 1955), British thoracic aristocrat
Nina Bratchikova (born 1985), Russian tennis player
Nina Starr Braunwald (1928–1992), American surgeon 
Nina Brosh (born 1975), Israeli model
Nina Bunjevac (born 1973), Serbian Canadian cartoonist
Nina Burger (born 1987), Austrian footballer
Nina Burleigh (born c. 1959 or 1960), American journalist
Nina Buysman (born 1997), Dutch cyclist
Nina Byers (1930–2014), American physicist
Nina Byron (1900–1987), American silent film actress
Nina Carberry (born 1984), Irish jockey
Nina Cheremisina (born 1946), Russian former rower 
Nina Clifford (1851–1929), Canadian-American madam
Nina Companeez (1937–2015), French screenwriter and film director
Nina Conti (born 1973), British actress
Nina Coltart (1927–1997), British psychoanalyst
Nina Coolman (born 1991), Belgian volleyball player
Nina Crone (1934–2007), Australian gardening writer, broadcaster, teacher and school principal
Nina Curtis (born 1988), Australian sailor
Nina Daniels (born 1982), New Zealand synchronised swimmer 
Nina Davies (cyclist) (born 1974), Welsh cyclist
Nina Davuluri (born 1989), American public speaker and Miss America 2014
Nina Derwael (born 2000), Belgian gymnast
Nina de Vries (born 1961), Dutch sex worker
Nina Dittrich (born 1990), Austrian swimmer
Nina Doroh (fl. 1970s), Belarusian sprint canoer
Nina Douglas-Hamilton, Duchess of Hamilton (1878–1951), British noblewoman
Nina Dübbers (born 1980), German tennis player
Nina Dumbadze (1919–1983), Georgian-Ukrainian discus thrower
Nina Đurđević (born 1991), Slovene model and Miss Universe Slovenia 2013
Nina Easton (born 1958), American journalist
Nina Elias-Bamberger (1954–2002), American television producer
Nina Etkin (1948–2009), American anthropologist and botanist
Nina Fedoroff (born 1942), American molecular biologist 
Nina Foch (1924–2008), Dutch-American actress
Nina Frolova (born 1948), Soviet rowing cox
Nina Fyodorova (1947–2019), Soviet skier
Nina Gäßler (born 1975), German mountain biker and rower
Nina Garsoïan (1923–2022), American historian
Nina Gavrylyuk (born 1965), Russian cross-country skier
Nina Genke-Meller (1893–1954), Russian artist
Princess Nina of Greece and Denmark (born 1987), Swiss businesswoman
Princess Nina Georgievna of Russia (1901–1974), Russian Princess
Nina Gerber, American guitarist
Nina Gerhard (born 1974), German Eurodance singer
Nina Gershon (born 1940), American judge
Nina Girado (full name Marifil Nina Barinos Girado-Enriquez, born 1980), Filipina singer
Nina Godiwalla (born 1975), American author and businesswoman
Nina Gold, British casting director 
Nina Gopova (born 1953), Russian canoer
Nina Gordon (born 1967), American rock singer
Nina Grebeshkova (born 1930), Russian actress
Nina Grewal (born 1958), Canadian politician
Nina Grieg, née Hagerup (1845–1935), Norwegian lyric soprano
Nina Gruzintseva (1934–2021), Russian canoer
Nina Goryunenko (born 2000), USA artist, model
Nina Hamnett (1890–1956), British artist
Nina Harmer (married name Nina Thompson, born 1945), American swimmer
Nina Hasselmann (born 1986), German field hockey player 
Nina Haver-Løseth (born 1989), Norwegian alpine skier
Nina Kiriki Hoffman (born 1955), American novelist
Nina Holmén (born 1951), Finnish long-distance athlete
Nina Hoss (born 1975), German actress
Nina Hossain (born 1973), British journalist
Nina Humphreys, British composer
Nina Hunt (1932–1995), Manx choreographer
Nina Ivanišin (born 1985), Slovenian actress
Nina Jablonski (born 1953), American anthropologist and palaeobiologist
Nina Jacobson (born 1965), American film executive
Nina Moore Jamieson (1885–1932), Canadian writer
Nina Jeriček (born 1984), Slovenian handballer 
Nina Johnsen, Norwegian cyclist
Nina Kamenik (born 1985), German ice hockey player
Nina Kasniunas (born 1972), American political scientist and writer
Nina Katchadourian (born 1968), American artist
Nina Kemppel (born 1970), American cross-country skier 
Nina Kessler (born 1988), Dutch cyclist
Nina Khachaturyan (1931–2020), Russian historian
Nina Khadzhiyankova (born 1963), Bulgarian basketball player
Nina Kinert (born 1983), Swedish musician
Nina Klenovska (born 1980), Bulgarian biathlete
Nina Kolarič (born 1986), Slovenian athlete
Nina Kolundžić (born 1990), Serbian handball player
Nina Koshetz (1891–1965), Ukrainian opera singer
Nina Kostroff Noble (born 1959), American television producer
Nina Kotova (born 1969), Russian cellist
Nina Kpaho (born 1996), Ivorian footballer
Nina Kraft (born 1968), German triathlete
Nina Kraljić (born 1992), Croatian singer-songwriter
Nina Kraus, American neuroscientist
Nina Kraviz (born 1989), Russian DJ
Nina Kulagina (1926–1990), Russian psychokineticist
Nina Kuscsik (born 1939), American long-distance athlete
Nina Lagergren (1921–2019), Swedish businesswoman and half-sister of Raoul Wallenberg
Nina Lawson (1926–2008), Scottish wig maker
Nina Laden (born 1962), American author and commercial illustrator of children's books
Nina Frances Layard (1853–1935), English poet, prehistorian, archaeologist and antiquary
Nina Lemesh (born 1973), Ukrainian biathlete
Nina Li Chi (born 1961), Hong Kong actress
Nina Ligon (born 1991), Thai equestrian
Nina Lobkovskaya (born 1925), Russian sniper
Nina Lobova (born 1957), Ukrainian handball athlete
Nina Lola Bachhuber (born 1971), German artist
Nina Lussi (born 1994), American ski jumper
Nina Makarova (1908–1976), Russian composer
Nina Makino (born 2005), American-Japanese idol singer and former child actress, member of the group NiziU
Nina Manucharyan (1885–1972), Armenian film actress
Nina Marković, Croatian physicist and professor
Nina Matsumoto (born 1984), Japanese-Canadian cartoonist
Nina Matviyenko (born 1947), Ukrainian singer
Nina McClelland (1930–2020), American chemist
Nina Mae McKinney (1912–1967), American actress
Nina Menkes (born 1955), American filmmaker
Nina Meurisse, French actress
Nina Miranda (born 1970), Brazilian singer
Nina Morić (born 1976), Croatian fashion model
Nina Morgunova (born 1951), Russian middle-distance athlete
Nina Morozova (born 1989), Russian sprint hurdle athlete
Nina Morrison (born 2000), Australian Australian rules footballer
Nina Mozer (born 1964), Russian ice-skating coach
Nina Müller (born 1980), German handball player
Nina Muradyan (born 1954), Armenian volleyball player
Nina Myskow (born 1946), Scottish journalist
Nina Nadira (born 1992), Malaysian singer and actress
Nina Nannar, British Asian journalist
Nina Nastasia (born 1966), American singer-songwriter
Nina Nesbitt (born 1994), Scottish singer and songwriter
Nina Norshie (born 2001), Ghanaian footballer
Nina Kamto Njitam (born 1983), Cameroonian handball player
Nina Olivette (1907–1971), American actress and dancer
Nina Otkalenko (1928–2015), Russian middle-distance athlete
Nina Paley (born 1968), American cartoonist and animator 
Nina Paw (born 1949), Hong Kong actress
Nina Pekerman (born 1977), Israeli triathlete
Nina Persson (born 1974), Swedish singer
Nina Petković (born 1981), Montenegrin singer and television personality
Nina Petrova (1893–1945), Russian sniper
Nina Petushkova (born 1992), Russian figure skater
Nina Ponomaryova (1929–2016), Russian discus athlete
Nina Potočnik (born 1997), Slovenian tennis player
Nina Power, British cultural critic, philosopher and translator
Nina Preobrazhenskaya (born 1956), Ukrainian rower
Nina Proll (born 1974), Austrian actress
Nina Proskura (born 1974), Ukrainian rower
Nina Wilcox Putnam (1888–1962), American writer
Nina Quartero (1908–1985), American actress
Nina Raine, English theatre director and playwright
Nina Rangelova (born 1999), Bulgarian swimmer
Nina Raspopova (1913–2009), Russian pilot
Nina Reithmayer (born 1984), Austrian luger 
Nina Repeta (born 1967), American actress
Nina Revoyr (born 1969), American novelist
Nina Ricci (1883–1970), French-Italian fashion designer
Nina Rillstone (born 1975), New Zealand long-distance athlete
Nina Robertson (born 1996), Australian beauty queen
Nina Rocheva (1948–2022), Russian cross-country skier 
Nina Rønsted, Danish botanist
Nina Rosenwald, American political activist and philanthropist
Nina Rosić (born 1990), Serbian volleyball player
Nina Roth (born 1988), American curler
Nina Ruslanova (1945–2021), Russian actress
Nina Saeedyokota (born 1994), Japanese gymnast
Nina Sandberg (born 1967), Norwegian politician
Nina Seničar (born 1985), Serbian actress and model
Nina Sevening (1885–1958), English stage actress
Nina Shatskaya (born 1966), Russian singer and actress
Nina Siciliana, Italian poet
Nina Simone (1933–2003), American singer, composer and civil rights activist
Nina Simonovich-Efimova (1877–1948), Russian artist and puppeteers
Nina Smoleyeva (born 1948), Russian volleyball player
Nina Snaith, British mathematician 
Nina Søby (born 1956), Norwegian cyclist
Nina Solheim (born 1979), Norwegian taekwondo practitioner
Nina Sosanya (born 1969), English actress
Nina Sosnina (1923–1943), Ukrainian resistance fighter 
Nina Statkevich (born 1944), Russian speed skater
Nina Stemme (born 1963), Swedish singer
Nina Stojanović (born 1996), Serbian tennis player
Nina Auchincloss Straight (born 1937), American author and journalist
Nina Tangri, (fl. 2018–present) Canadian politician
Nina Tassler (fl. 2004–2015), American television executive
Nina Taylor, Australian politician
Nina Tenge, German rapper
Nina Teicholz, American journalist 
Nina Temple (born 1956), British politician
Nina Tikkinen (born 1987), Finnish ice hockey player
Nina Totenberg (born 1944), American journalist
Nina Toussaint-White (born 1985), English actress
Nina Turner, (born 1967), American politician
Nina Ulanova (born 1978), Russian ice skater
Nina Ulyanenko (1923–2005), Russian navigator and pilot
Nina Umanets (born 1956), Ukrainian rower
Nina Usatova (born 1951), Russian actress
Nina van Pallandt (born 1932), Danish singer (of Nina & Frederik) and actress
Nina Vance (1914–1980), American entrepreneur
Nina Vanna, stage name of Nina Yazykova Kind Hakim Provatoroff (1899–1953), Belarusian actress 
Nina Veselova (1922–1960), Russian painter
Nina Violić (born 1972), Croatian actress
Nina Vislova (born 1986), Russian badminton player
Nina Wadia (born 1968), British actress
Nina Wang, (born Kung Yu Sum, 1937–2007), Chinese billionaire
Nina Wayne (born 1943), American actress
Nina Weckström (born 1979), Finnish badminton player
Nina Woodford (born 1971), Swedish songwriter
Nina Young (born 1966), Australian actress
Nina Žabjek (born 1998), Slovenian handball player
Nina Zagat, of Tim and Nina Zagat, American entrepreneur and publisher
Nina Zander (born 1990), German tennis player
Nina Zhivanevskaya (born 1977), Russian swimmer
Nina Zhuk (born 1934), Russian pair skater
Nina Zulić (born 1995), Slovenian handball player
Nina Zyuskova (born 1952), Ukrainian middle-distance athlete

Nickname

Mizz Nina, professional name of Shazrina binti Azman (born 1980), Malaysian fashion designer
Nina (Spanish singer) (born 1932), professional name of Anna Maria Agustí Flores (born 1966), Spanish actress and singer
Nina, former ring name of Lisa Mary Moretti, who has also been known as Ivory (wrestler), Tina Ferrari and Tina Moretti (born 1961), American professional wrestler
 Nina Barka (born Marie Smirsky, 1908–1986), French-Ukrainian artist
Nina Bo'nina Brown, stage name of Pierre Leverne Dease (born 1982), American drag performer
Nina Bonaparte, pen name of Éléonore-Justine Ruflin (1832–1905), French writer and wife of Prince Pierre-Napoléon Bonaparte
 Nina Bouraoui, nickname of Yasmina Bouraoui (born 1967), French author
Nina Boyle, nickname of Constance Antonina Boyle (1865–1943), British journalist
 Nina Campbell, nickname of Henrietta Sylvia Campbell (born 1945), English interior designer
Nina Carter, (born Penelope Jane Mallett, 1952), English model and singer
Nina Cassian, pen name of Renée Annie Cassian-Mătăsaru (1924–2014), Romanian poet, translator, journalist and composer
Nina M. Davies, published under the co-pen name N. de Garis Davies (1881–1965), Scottish egyptologist 
Nina Dobrev, professional name of Nikolina Kamenova Dobreva (born 1989), Bulgarian actress raised in Canada
Nina Fedorova, pen name of Antonina Riasanovsky, (1895–1985), Russian author
Nina Flowers, stage name of Jorge Luis Flores Sanchez (born 1974), Puerto Rican drag queen and celebrity
 Nina García, nickname of Ninotchka García (born 1965), Colombian fashion journalist and critic
Nina Hagen, nickname of Catharina Hagen (born 1955), German singer
Nina Hartley, stage name of Marie Louise Hartman (born 1959), American pornographic actress
Nina Las Vegas, stage name of Nina Elizabeth Agzarian (born 1984), Australian radio host, DJ and music producer
Nina Liedtke, nickname of Antonina Liedtke, Polish writer and editor
Nina Morato (born Stéphanie Morato, 1966), French singer-songwriter
Nina Radojičić, nickname of Danica Prodanović (born 1989), Serbian singer
 Nina Pacari (born María Estela Vega Conejo, 1961), Kichwa/Ecuadorian indigenous leader
Nina Pillard, nickname of Cornelia Thayer Livingston Pillard (born 1961), American Judge 
Nina Ramirez, nickname of Janina Sara Maria Ramirez (born 1980), British historian and TV presenter
Nina Rasul, nickname of Santanina Tillah Rasul (born Santanina Centi Tillah, 1930), Filipina politician
 Nina Ricci (designer) (born Maria Nielli; 1883–1970), Italian fashion designer
Nina Salaman, nickname of Paulina Ruth Salaman (1877–1925), British poet and translator
Nina Sicilia, nickname of Alejandrina Sicilia Hernández (born 1962), Venezuelan model and Miss International 1985
Nina Siemaszko, nickname of Antonina Jadwiga Siemaszko (born 1970), American actress
Nina Simone, professional name of Eunice Kathleen Waymon (1933–2003), American singer, songwriter, musician, arranger, and civil rights activist
Nina Sublatti (born Nina Sulaberidze, 1995), Georgian singer, songwriter, calligrapher and model
 Nina Schenk Gräfin von Stauffenberg (1913–2006), nickname of Elisabeth Magdalena Schenk Gräfin von Stauffenberg, wife of Claus Schenk Graf von Stauffenberg, failed assassin of Adolf Hitler
Nína Tryggvadóttir, nickname of Jónína Tryggvadóttir (1913–1968), Icelandic artist
Nina Tayeb, nickname of Ninet Tayeb (born 1983), Israeli entertainer
Nina West, stage name of Andrew Levitt (born 1977), American drag queen, actor and singer
Nina Zilli, stage name of Maria Chiara Fraschetta (born 1980), Italian singer-songwriter.

Fictional characters

Nina, from Nina Needs to Go!
 Nina, the title character of Nina's World
 Nina, a character in the Disney Junior television series Imagination Movers
 Nina, a Costa Rican Wild Kratts Kids girl from Wild Kratts
 Nina, a character from the book Almayer's Folly by Joseph Conrad
 Nina Ash, from the American television series Angel
 Nina Azarova, from the American webseries, The OA
 Nina Bailey, from Home and Away
 Nina Brown, from the BBC soap opera EastEnders
 Nina Bulsara, from Doctors
 Nina Caliente, from the life simulation video games The Sims 2, The Sims 3 and The Sims 4.
 Nina Callas, from The Clique series of books
 Nina Campbell, from the American sitcom 3rd Rock from the Sun
 Nina Cortex, from the Crash Bandicoot series of games
 Nina Cortlandt, from the soap opera All My Children
 Nina Del Marco, a character in the Netflix series Grand Army
 Nina Einstein, from the anime Code Geass
 Nina Flores, from Clifford's Puppy Days
 Nina Fortner, from Naoki Urasawa's anime Monster
 Nina Frost, from the book Perfect Match by Jodi Picoult
 Nina Gilbert, from Home and Away
 Nina Gupta, from the BBC soap opera EastEnders
 Nina Harper, from the animated series Braceface
 Nina Harris, from the BBC soap opera EastEnders
 Nina Jarvis, from the USA Network science fiction television series The 4400
 Nina Lucas, from the ITV soap opera Coronation Street
 Nina Mandal, from Coronation Street
 Nina Martin, a character from House of Anubis
 Nina Mauricius–Sanders, a character from Goede Tijden, Slechte Tijden
 Nina Myers, a terrorism analyst in the TV series 24
 Nina Natsume, from the Urara Meirocho
 Nina Neckerly, a giraffe from Camp Lazlo
 Nina Olivera, from Home and Away
 Nina Pickering, werewolf from the TV series Being Human
 Nina Price, also known as Vampire by Night, a Marvel Comics character
 Nina Purpleton, female lead character in Mobile Suit Gundam 0083: Stardust Memory
 Nina Reeves, from General Hospital
 Nina Rosario, from Lin-Manuel Miranda's musical In The Heights
 Nina Sakura, from Ultra Maniac
 Nina Sayers, from the 2010 film Black Swan
 Nina Mikhailovna Zarechnaya, from Anton Chekhov's play The Seagull
 Nina Sharp, from Fringe
 Nina Thumbell, the daughter of Thumbelina from the Mattel franchise Ever After High
 Nina Tucker, from the Australian soap opera Neighbours
 Nina Tucker, from the anime Fullmetal Alchemist
 Nina Van Horn, from American TV show, Just Shoot Me!
 Nina van Rooyen, from the book Fiela's Child by Dalene Matthee
 Nina Vorhees, nickname of Nitia Vorhees, from The Passage
 Nina Walsh, from Smart_Guy
 Nina Wáng, from the anime Mai Otome
 Nina Webster, from the soap opera The Young and the Restless
 Nina Williams, a fictional assassin from the Tekken series of games
 Nina Williams, alternate name of Nene Williams, from Neighbours
 Nina Windia, from the Breath of Fire series of games
 Nina Yamada, from Mamotte! Lollipop
 Nina Sergeevna Krilova, former KGB officer in The Americans
 Nina Zenik, a character in the Six of Crows duology 
 Nina Salazar-Roberts, a main character in the Disney+ TV series, High School Musical: The Musical: The Series
Nina from You Were Never Really Here, film by Lynne Ramsay

Surname
Joe Nina, stage name of Makhosini Henry Xaba, (born 1974), South African singer
Julián Apasa Nina, birthname of Túpac Katari (c. 1750–1781), Bolivian rebel
Li Nina (born 1983), Chinese aerial skier
Lorenzo Nina (1812–1885), Italian prelate
Song Nina (born 1980), Chinese volleyball player
Ur-Nina (fl. c. 2550 BC–2500 BC), Iraqi king

See also

Nana (surname)
Nena (name)
Nia (given name)
Nika (given name)
Nima (name)
Nin (surname)
 Nina (disambiguation)
 Niña (name)
Nine (disambiguation)
 Nino (name)
 Niño (name)
Ning (surname)
Ninja (disambiguation)
Nipa (disambiguation)
Nita (given name)
Niwa (disambiguation)
Nuna (disambiguation)
 Cecilia Bowes-Lyon, Countess of Strathmore and Kinghorne, British royal known as Cecilia Nina Bowes-Lyon
 Saint Nino (anglicized to Nina), an Eastern-orthodox saint
 Nina Never Knew, song

References

Belarusian feminine given names
Bulgarian feminine given names
Croatian feminine given names
Czech feminine given names
Danish feminine given names
English feminine given names
Faroese feminine given names
Finnish feminine given names
Filipino feminine given names
German feminine given names
Icelandic feminine given names
Italian feminine given names
Macedonian feminine given names
Norwegian feminine given names
Polish feminine given names
Russian feminine given names
Serbian feminine given names
Slovak feminine given names
Slovene feminine given names
Swedish feminine given names